Xanthonychoidea is a taxonomic superfamily of air-breathing land snails, land slugs and semi-slugs, terrestrial pulmonate gastropod mollusks in the clade Stylommatophora.

Taxonomy

2005 taxonomy
The taxon Xanthonychoidea was not used in the taxonomy of the Gastropoda by Bouchet & Rocroi, 2005. The family Xanthonychidae was placed within the superfamily Helicoidea.

2012 taxonomy
Thompson & Naranjo-García (2012) described a new family Echinichidae and placed it to the superfamily Xanthonychoidea.

Families within the Xanthonychoidea include:
 Echinichidae
 Xanthonychidae

References

External links

Stylommatophora